A bestseller is a book that has been identified as extremely popular.

Bestseller or Best Seller may also refer to:

Film and television
 Best Seller, a 1987 film by John Flynn
 Bestseller (film), a 2010 South Korean mystery thriller film
 Best Sellers (TV series), a 1976–1977 NBC series
 Bestsellers (web series), an American comedy web television series
 Best Sellers (film), a 2021 film by Lina Roessler

Other uses
 Bestseller (company), a Danish clothing company
 Bestseller (music), a song or album charted on a bestsellers list such as Billboard's
 "Best Seller" (short story), a 1930 short story by P. G. Wodehouse

See also 
 Top Sellers Ltd, an imprint of Thorpe & Porter
 List of best-selling albums
 List of best-selling books
 List of best-selling music artists
 List of best-selling video games
 The New York Times Best Seller list